
The Avia BH-5 was a two-seat sport aircraft built in Czechoslovakia in 1923. It was based on the firm's experience with the BH-1 and shared that aircraft's basic design: a low-wing, braced monoplane. As a result of its L-BOSA registration, all slow flying Avia monoplanes of the BH-5 lineage (BH-5 through to BH-12) were nicknamed Boska. The BH-5 was flown competitively by Zdeněk Lhota at the Belgian Touring Aircraft Contest in Brussels in 1923, and won both the overall prize for the event and the King of Belgium Prize. The same year, it won the first prize in its class in the Czechoslovak President of the Republic Competition.

On 1 June 2007, a replica (OK-BOS) built by Marcel Sezemský and members of Historická letka Republiky československé, completed its first flight from Mladá Boleslav in the Czech Republic. The engine used is an original 1923 Walter NZ 60 five-cylinder unit.

Specifications

References

Notes

Bibliography

 
 Němeček, V. (1968). Československá letadla. Praha: Naše Vojsko.
 Historická Letka Republiky Československé website (pdf document)
 The 2007 test flight reportage (in Czech)

Single-engined tractor aircraft
Low-wing aircraft
1920s Czechoslovakian sport aircraft
BH-05
Aircraft first flown in 1923